The Lawrence County Courthouse is a government building for Lawrence County, Mississippi, United States, located in the county seat of Monticello. It was built in 1913 and was listed on the National Register of Historic Places on March 4, 1993. It was declared a Mississippi Landmark in 1986.

See also 
 List of Mississippi Landmarks
 National Register of Historic Places listings in Lawrence County, Mississippi

References

Government buildings completed in 1913
Neoclassical architecture in Mississippi
County courthouses in Mississippi
Courthouses on the National Register of Historic Places in Mississippi
1913 establishments in Mississippi
Mississippi Landmarks
National Register of Historic Places in Lawrence County, Mississippi